The Madawaska–Edmundston Border Crossing is located at the Edmundston–Madawaska Bridge that connects the town of Madawaska, Maine with Edmundston, New Brunswick on the Canada–US border.

History
Prior to the construction of the original bridge in 1921, a hand-pulled ferry provided a way to cross the Saint John River at this location.  The first US border station at Madawaska was a small white cabin at the end of the bridge.  Around 1930, a two-story wooden border station was constructed.  This was replaced by the current one-story brick border station in 1960.  For many years, Canada had a small wooden border station with a red roof.  This structure was replaced in 1992 with the current brick facility.

See also
 List of Canada–United States border crossings
 Edmundston–Madawaska Bridge

References

Canada–United States border crossings
Madawaska, Maine
Madawaska County, New Brunswick
1854 establishments in Maine
1854 establishments in New Brunswick